Hecho en Mexico or similar may mean:
 Hecho en Mexico (Kinto Sol album)
 Hecho en México (El Tri album)
 Hecho en México (Alejandro Fernández album)

See also
 Made in Mexico (disambiguation)